Chua Tian Chang, better known as Tian Chua (born 21 December 1963), is a Malaysian politician who served as Special Advisor to the Minister of Works from March 2019 to February 2020 and Member of Parliament (MP) for Batu from March 2008 to May 2018. He is an independent and was a member of the People's Justice Party (PKR), a component party of the Pakatan Harapan (PH) and formerly Pakatan Rakyat (PR) as well as Barisan Alternatif (BA) opposition coalitions. He served as Vice-President of PKR from the founding of PKR in April 1999 to July 2022 and  Information Chief of PKR from April 2004 to March 2008 and Division Chief of Batu of PKR before July 2022.

Early life 
Born in Malacca on 21 December 1963, he was the eldest of four siblings. His father, Chua Neo Lai, is of Hakka descent and was a rice wholesaler. His late mother, Chan Yuet Chien, was a Chinese schoolteacher. Chua was educated in Siang Lin Primary School and Malacca Catholic High School. He then studied Lower Six in Gajah Berang High School. In 1982, Tian went to continue his studies in Australia. He first studied Matriculation in South Sydney High School. After completing HSC, he got admitted into Agricultural Science in Sydney University. He said:

But in his third year, he switched to Philosophy at the University of New South Wales. Australia in the 1980s was a hotbed for student activists. "My father had hoped I'd study law for good future prospects. But I became exposed to peace movements, environmental issues, and human rights situations around the world". He became an active student leader and was involved in student movement under the Network of Overseas Student Collectives (NOSCA) and Left Alliance. His mates included Steven Gan and Premesh Chandran, co-founders of news website Malaysiakini. Together, they protested against the imposition of university fees on foreign students started by Bob Hawke's administration in 1985. Chua had his first taste of arrest when he was locked up after a demonstration in Sydney. He was also recruited by East Timor then leader-in-exile, now president Ramos Horta to help prepare newsletters.

Early career 
Upon returning to Malaysia in 1990, he joined Suara Rakyat Malaysia (SUARAM) in the campaign against Internal Security Act (ISA). He also began to get involved in the labour movement in Malaysia. In 1992, he joined Hong Kong-based Asia Monitor Resource Center (AMRC), a regional labour research NGO.

After his contract in Hong Kong ended, he went for further studies in the Institute of Social Studies (ISS) in The Hague, The Netherlands. He graduated with Masters in Employment & Labour Studies. Tian again returned to Malaysia in 1996 and continued to pursue a trail of life as social activist.

In 1997, Tian was appointed the director of Labour Resource Centre (LRC). The centre was found in 1990 by a group of trade unionists and labour activists. He was also in the Board of SUARAM.

In 1998, SUARAM initiated a forum comprised NGOs and opposition parties known as Gagasan Demokrasi Rakyat Malaysia. The forum was officially launched during the saga of Anwar Ibrahim and Reformasi. Tian was elected the chairperson of the movement.

Reformasi and Detention under ISA 
Chua was involved with the Reformasi movement in Malaysia in 1999 due to the sacking of Anwar Ibrahim as Deputy Prime Minister. He became famous when images of him sitting defiantly in front of a police water cannon truck were splashed across the global media during the height of the movement.

Between 27 and 30 September 1999, Tian Chua and six other activists, including KeADILan leaders; Youth leader Mohd Ezam Mohd Nor, Mohamed Azmin Ali and Dr Badrul Amin Baharun; were arrested and as a result prevented from contesting in the 1999 general elections. Further arrests were made on 10 April 2001 and those arrested were subsequently charged and in carcerated under the Internal Security Act (ISA). They became known as the Reformasi 10.

At the Kamunting detention camp, Tian Chua kept himself busy by dabbling in his love for drawing and painting. He drew the insects that entered his cell and made over 100 Hari Raya and Chinese New Year cards for friends and family. He had much time to read including heavy tomes like Homer's Iliad, and learnt Thai, Norwegian, Arabic, French and Sanskrit, which he has mostly forgotten now. Tian Chua spent two years in detention under the ISA and numerous times in police lock-ups for championing various causes since 1996.

Political involvement 
In 1999, Tian Chua was invited to join the newly founded Parti Keadilan Nasional (KeADILan) headed by Dr Wan Azizah. In 2004, KeADILan merged with Parti Rakyat Malaysia (PRM) and formed Parti Keadilan Rakyat (PKR). Tian Chua was appointed the Information Chief and was then elected the national vice-president of the party.

He has manned the PKR service centre in the heart of Sentul since it was opened in 2004. Areas that came under his Batu constituency include Sentul. The constituency has the most Projek Perumahan Rakyat (PPR) public housing apartments and one of the highest rates of petty crime in the city. Tian Chua as a lawmaker himself later, had pledged not to change his ways:

In the 2008 general election (GE12), Tian Chua contested in the Batu parliamentary constituency in Kuala Lumpur and won, defeating Barisan Nasional's Lim Si Pin with a 9,455 majority, who is the son of Lim Keng Yaik the former national president of Parti Gerakan Rakyat Malaysia (Gerakan). Tian Chua won for the second time in the Batu, Kuala Lumpur for the 2013 general election (GE13) defeating BN's Dominic Lau Hoe Chai with 13,284 majority.

Tian Chua was disqualified to contest and unable defend his Batu parliamentary seat in the 2018 general election (GE14) when his nomination was rejected due to a RM2,000 fine from a court case that he paid in 2010. He instead endorsed one of the independent candidates, 22-year-old law student Prabakaran Parameswaran who later won the seat and jointed PKR as the country's youngest parliamentarian. The High Court in 2019 declared that his GE14 disqualification was invalid and that he is eligible to contest future general elections. Tian Chua was appointed as the Special Adviser to the Minister of Works during the short ruling period of the Pakatan Harapan (PH) administration after GE14 from March 2019 until it collapse due to the political crisis in 2020 in February.

Issues and controversies

Attacking, disobeying and insulting police cases
In a 2007 demonstration in front of the parliament, Tian Chua had bit a police constable's arm which had led to him being charged in 2009 under Section 332 of the Penal Code. He was convicted and sentenced to his six-month jail and RM3,000 fine but upon his appeal, the High Court had later reduced it to just a RM2,000 fine in 2010. The ruling enabled Tian Chua to keep his MP seat of Batu won in GE12 and even for him to retain it again in GE13. Somehow the 2010 court case judgement had caused Tian Chua's GE14 candidacy been rejected unexpectedly but the High Court had later overturned the disqualification and maintained his eligibility contesting future elections in 2019.

In 2012, Tian Chua was arrested at the Bersih 3.0 rally and was later detained of committing an offense of trespassing Police Training Centre (PULAPOL), a "Restricted  Area". He was then charged, convicted and sentenced by the Sessions Court in 2014 to one-month's imprisonment and a RM1,000 fine for refusing a police order to leave the PULAPOL. After five years fighting for his case in the High Court and the Court of Appeal, he finally withdrew his appeal and was sent to jail in 2017.

In another 2014 incident, Tian Chua had insulted a policeman in front of a hotel where he was then charged for outraging the modesty of the police officer by using foul language and ordered by the court in 2017 to pay a total of RM3,000 following his conviction. Somehow again the High Court had later reduced the fine to RM2,000 while upheld his conviction.

Accusation of sedition 
Following the 2013 Lahad Datu standoff, Tian Chua commenting through his Twitter hinted that the country standoff with the defunct-Sultanate of Sulu throne claimants followers from the southern Philippines was staged by the Malaysian ruling government party of United Malays National Organisation (UMNO), where he was then heavily criticised by the party politicians as well the public for his lacking of "sensitiveness" on the issue. Tian Chua was then asked by UMNO to withdraw his defamation remarks although he refused which led the case being brought to court. Through his defence statement in court, he denied making defamation words towards the party.

In 2014, Tian Chua agreed to withdraw his remarks, where the charges towards him was dropped soon thereafter. Attempts to appeal the case by the prosecution went unheeded by the court and he was finally cleared of sedition charge in 2016.

Election results

In popular culture 
In 2009, Tian Chua took the lead role in a science fiction short film titled One Future, which depicted Malaysia as an Orwellian dystopia. The character's fate at the hands of the authorities in the film mirrors aspects of Tian Chua's own public life.

See also
 Batu (federal constituency)

References 

1963 births
Living people
People from Malacca
Malaysian people of Hakka descent
Malaysian politicians of Chinese descent
Prisoners and detainees of Malaysia
Malaysian democracy activists
Former People's Justice Party (Malaysia) politicians
Independent politicians in Malaysia
Members of the Dewan Rakyat
University of New South Wales alumni
21st-century Malaysian politicians